Paraphotinus is a genus of central American fireflies (first described as a subgenus), distinguished from the closely related Photinus by the presence of ventral branches in their aedeagal parameres. It was recently elevated to genus level.

Species list
 Paraphotinus aulophallus Zaragoza-Caballero y Gutiérrez-Carranza, 2018
 Paraphotinus furcatus Zaragoza-Caballero, 2000
 Paraphotinus tlapacoyaensis Zaragoza-Caballero, 1996
 Paraphotinus tuxtlaensis Zaragoza-Caballero, 1995
 Paraphotinus victori Zaragoza-Caballero, 2020

References

Lampyridae genera
Lampyridae
Beetles of North America